Jonny Phillips (born 11 January 1971, in Kendal, Westmorland, England) is an English jazz guitarist and composer. He played the violin and studied theory from the age of five, however he swapped to guitar at fifteen to study jazz, Brazilian and African music. After his studies at Newcastle College of Music, Phillips moved to London where he set up his group Oriole, with whom he has released three albums on the F-IRE Collective label. Oriole is perhaps one of the few groups to feature two Mercury nominated artists: Ben Davis on cello and Seb Rochford on drums. Phillips is now based in South London after three and a half years living in Andalusia, Spain.

Oriole 
Albums
 Song for the Sleeping (F-IRE Collective, 2005)
 Migration (F-IRE Collective, 2006)
 Every New Day (F-IRE Collective, 2011)

Lineup
Jonny Phillips – guitar
Ingrid Laubrock – tenor Saxophone
Ben Davis – cello
Idris Rahman – tenor saxophone
Nick Ramm – piano
Adriano Adewale – percussion
Ruth Goller – bass
Fernando De Marco – bass
Seb Rochford – drums

Magical Realism

The music of Oriole has on occasion been associated with magical realist literature.

Associated bands 
Phillips has also played and recorded with:
Soothsayers
Julia Biel
F-ire Large Ensemble
Seb Rochfords Polar Bear
Renato D'Aiello

Discography
The Perrier Award Winners -JazzFm compilation (Jazz-Fm, 2000)
Song for the Sleeping – Oriole (F-IRE Collective, 2005)
Migration – Oriole (F-IRE Collective, 2006)
Not Alone – Julia Biel (Rokit, 2006)
Held on the Tips of Fingers – Polar Bear (Babel Label, 2006)
F-ire Works Vol. 1 (F-IRE Collective, 2006)
Tangled Roots –  Red Earth, 2006
F-ire Works Vol. 2 (F-IRE Collective, 2007)
ZOOM! European Jazz Collective (Yolk, 2007)

Reviews 
 Timeout
 The Guardian
 The Guardian – live review
 Ronnie Scott's Magazine
 Straight No Chaser
 Cheltenham Jazz Festival Review
 The Guardian
 Echoes, Kevin Le Gendre
 The Independent
 Jazzwise
 The Herald
 Straight No Chaser 2

References

External links
 Jonnyphillips.com
 Oriole-music.co.uk
 F-ire.com
 myspace/oriole2
 myspace/phillipsleach

1971 births
Living people
English jazz composers
Male jazz composers
English male composers
English jazz guitarists
English male guitarists
21st-century British guitarists
21st-century British male musicians